Steven Hinton (born 5 August 1971 in Ipswich, Queensland, Australia) is an Australian baseball player. He represented Australia at the 1996 Summer Olympics.

References

1971 births
Olympic baseball players of Australia
Australian baseball players
Baseball players at the 1996 Summer Olympics
Living people
Sportspeople from Ipswich, Queensland